Metaphit (1-[1-(3-Isothiocyanato)phenyl]cyclohexylpiperidine) is a research chemical that acts as an acylator of NMDARAn, sigma and DAT binding sites in the CNS. It is the m-isothiocyanate derivative of phencyclidine (PCP) and binds irreversibly (forming a covalent bond) to the PCP binding site on the NMDA receptor complex. However, later studies suggest the functionality of metaphit is mediated by sites not involved in PCP-induced passive avoidance deficit, and not related to the NMDA receptor complex. Metaphit was also shown to prevent d-amphetamine induced hyperactivity, while significantly depleting dopamine content in the nucleus accumbens. Metaphit was the first acylating ligand used to study the cocaine receptor. It is a structural isomer of the similar research compound fourphit, as it and metaphit both are isothiocyanate substituted derivatives of an analogous scaffold shared with PCP.

References

Arylcyclohexylamines
Dopamine reuptake inhibitors
Dissociative drugs
NMDA receptor antagonists
1-Piperidinyl compounds
Sigma agonists
Irreversible antagonists
Irreversible agonists
Isothiocyanates